The 11th Infantry Division, Philippine Army, also called the Alakdan Division, is one of the Philippine Army's infantry units in Mindanao.
Currently still forming, the Division is expected to complete its equipment and manpower requirements by 2022. It is the youngest of all the infantry divisions of the Army and will have 4,500 troops when fully formed.

History
On 17 December 2018, President Duterte, accompanied by Defense Secretary Delfin Lorenzana, led the activation of the 11th Infantry ‘Alakdan’ (Scorpion) Division at Kuta Heneral Teodulfo Bautista, headquarters of Joint Task Force Sulu in Barangay Bus-Bus, Jolo, Sulu.

Composed of units already present in Sulu working under Joint Task Force Sulu, the various units were formed into a new Division dedicated in fighting the ISIS affiliated terrorist groups in the region.

On 28 January 2019, following the bombing of the Cathedral of Our Lady of Mount Carmel in Jolo on 27 January 2019, the Armed Forces of the Philippines launched an all out assault on known Abu Sayyaf bases in the area. Led by the elite Philippine Scout Rangers, the 11th Infantry Division were given a supporting role and engaged the terrorists trying to flee the combat zone.

It has been reported by Philippine Media on 30 May 2019 that the 1st Brigade Combat Team will be assigned to the Division to aid in the operations against the Abu Sayyaf. These troops arrived on board the BRP Tarlac (LD-601) on 31 May 2019.

On 28 June 2019, two suicide bombers detonated themselves at the gate of the tactical command post of the First Brigade Combat Team (1BCT) in Sitio Tanjung, Barangay Kajatian, Sulu. The blast killed three soldiers and three civilians as well as the bombers. It is believed that this is the first instance of a suicide bombing conducted by native Filipinos.

A British businessman, Allan Hyrons, 70, and his wife, Wilma, were rescued by elite troops of the 2nd Special Forces Battalion with support from the 11th Infantry “Alakdan” Division who found them abandoned by kidnappers at the forested areas of Mt. Piahan, boundary of Barangays Silangkan and Kaha in Parang, Sulu in the morning of 25 November 2019.

An argument with an inebriated soldier resulted in the deaths of three members of the 9th Field Artillery Battalion, Army Artillery Regiment, at Barangay Liang in Patikul on 31 January 2020. Corporal Jack Indap shot dead two officers, Major Rael Gabot and First Lieutenant Ryan Lamoste, as they confronted him for being drunk on duty. Indap was later killed by responding personnel. The 9th Field Artillery Battalion is attached to the 11th Infantry Division as one of its support units.

On 29 June 2020, 4 intelligence officers believed assigned to the 11th Military Intelligence Battalion were killed in a friendly fire incident by Philippine National Police personnel manning a checkpoint in Jolo, Sulu.

On 23 August 2020, two powerful bomb explosions occurred on Jolo island in Sulu. Six civilians, seven soldiers, and a police officer were killed in the blasts that went off in a busy street while 75 other people – including at least 48 civilians, 21 soldiers, and six police officers – were injured. Islamic State militants have claimed responsibility.

To improve coordination with Philippine Navy and Air Force units, the Division conducted the weeklong LUPAH SUG 01-2021 Exercises. Ended on 19 February 2021, the exercise sought to solve the difficulties shown during Operation Perfect Storm 2 conducted in 2020.

Newly organized 101st Infantry "Sajahitra" Battalion has completed its Unit Organizational Training at the 11th Division Training School in Camp Bud Datu, Barangay Tagbak, Indanan, Sulu on June 6, 2022. This new unit will be added to the Division.

Mission
The 11th Infantry (Alakdan) Division, Philippine Army conducts military and rescue operations against the terrorist group, Abu Sayyaf, known to operate in the area.

Area of Responsibility 
The Division has operational responsibility over the Sulu Archipelago consisting of the provinces of Basilan, Sulu and Tawi-Tawi. The entire region is part of the Bangsamoro Autonomous Region in Muslim Mindanao (BARMM).

Official Seal of 11ID 
The official seal of the Division is an irregular hexagon divided in half with a scorpion (Filipino: Alakdan) over a green field on top and two crossed bolos and a kris over a brown field below.

Lineage of Commanding Generals 
 MGen Divino Rey C. Pabayo Jr., PA – (17 December 2018 – 3 July 2019)
 MGen Corleto S. Vinluan Jr., PA – (3 July 2019 – 18 August 2020)
 MGen William S. Gonzalez, PA – (18 August 2020 – 23 February 2022)
 MGen Ignatius N. Patrimonio, PA – (23 February 2022 – Present)

Units 
Main Units:
  1101st Infantry Brigade (Gagandilan) - formed from elements of the 101st Infantry Brigade;
 32nd Infantry "Daredevil" Battalion - reassigned
 35th Infantry "Makamandag" Battalion - reassigned
  1102nd Infantry Brigade (Ganarul) - formed from elements of the 104th Infantry Brigade;
 18th Infantry "Deo Et Patria" Battalion - reassigned
 64th Infantry "Knights" Battalion - reassigned
 1st Brigade Combat Team - assigned 31 May 2019
 45th Infantry "Gallant" Battalion - from the 5th Infantry Division;
 92nd Infantry "Tanglaw Diwa" Battalion - from the 2nd Infantry Division;
 6th Mechanized Battalion (Provisional) - from the Mechanized Infantry Division;
 9th Field Artillery Battalion (Provisional) - from the Army Artillery Regiment;
 71st Division Reconnaissance Company - from the 7th Infantry Division;
 500th Engineering Combat Battalion (Provisional)
 Brigade Support Battalion (Provisional) - formerly 2FSSU from Army Support Command
 Brigade Signal Company, 7th Signal Battalion - from the Army Signal Regiment;
 1st Civil Military Operations Platoon, 2nd CMO Company, 7th CMO Battalion - from the 7th Infantry Division;
 1st Military Police Platoon, 7th MP Company - from the 7th Infantry Division;
 CBRN Team, EOO Battalion - from Army Support Command
 EOD Platoon, EOD Battalion - from Army Support Command

Attached Units:
 21st Infantry Battalion - originally with the 501st Infantry Brigade
 41st Infantry Battalion - originally with the 501st Infantry Brigade
 66th Infantry Battalion
 74th Infantry Battalion
 101st Infantry "Sajahitra" Battalion - as of 6 June 2022

Support Units:
  11th Military Intelligence Battalion - formerly the 11th Military Intelligence Company. 1st Military Intelligence Battalion;
  15th Civil Military Operations Battalion - formed from existing CMO contingents in Sulu;
  11th Division Training School (11DTS);
  11th Services Support Battalion 
  111th Division Reconnaissance Company (111DRC) - formed from the unfilled 12th DRC.
  11th Signals Battalion - newly activated as of 1 December 2018

See also
 Armed Forces of the Philippines
 Philippine Army

References

Infantry divisions of the Philippines
Military units and formations established in 2018
Sulu